Hollett is a surname. Notable people with the surname include:

 Jennifer Hollett (born 1975), former MuchMusic VJ
 Michael Hollett (21st century), Canadian newspaper journalist
 Roger Hollett (born 1978), Canadian mixed martial artist
 William Hollett (1911–1999), Canadian professional ice hockey defenceman